Captain Benjamin John Legge Rogers-Tillstone (30 March 1900 – 11 January 1973) was a British Royal Navy officer and philatelist who was added to the Roll of Distinguished Philatelists in 1970.

References

Signatories to the Roll of Distinguished Philatelists
1900 births
1973 deaths
British philatelists
Presidents of the Royal Philatelic Society London
Royal Navy officers